Nagabhushana N S, also known as Nagabhushana, is an Indian film actor, who has worked predominantly in Kannada movie industry. Nagabhushana made his debut with the Kannada film Sankashta Kara Ganapathi.

Career 
Nagabhushan joined GPIER, an amateur theatre group founded by Rangayana artist Mime Ramesh.He worked in a government job before he left the job to pursue a career in acting. Along with his friends from college, he started a YouTube channel, Karnataka Entertainment Board, in 2016 to convey socially relevant issue through humour. He has acted, directed and wrote scripts of many of the episodes published in the channel. One of the episode named "Lucia Pawan has HFPS Disease", in which Pawan Kumar acted as a patient with social media addiction, has received more than 350,000 views on Youtube. After making his film debut with Badmaash (2016), he acted in Sankashta Kara Ganapathi (2018) as Likith Shetty's friend. A critic from The Times of India noted that "Nagabhushan as Likith's best buddy is a hoot and is another show stealer". He wrote the story for a web series titled Honeymoon and also acted in it opposite Sanjana Aanand. The episodes of the Honeymoon web series were first released in Telugu on Aha streaming service and later in Kannada on Voot. He has also acted in a lead role in Ikkat, a comedy entertainer which depicts the struggles of a married couple during the Covid-19 related forced lockdown. The Ikkat movie premiered on July 21, 2021, on Amazon Prime Video and got mostly positive reviews by film critics. A BookMyShow review on the Ikkat film mentioned that "Nagabhushan pulls off a brilliant comical act with a great mix of expressions and dialogue delivery".

Filmography

Films
All films are in Kannada, unless otherwise noted.

Accolades

External links

References 

Living people
1986 births
Indian actors